Never Tigere (born 16 December 1990) is a Zimbabwean footballer who plays as a central midfielder for Azam and the Zimbabwe national team. He was named in Zimbabwe's squad for the 2021 Africa Cup of Nations.

References

External links

1990 births
Living people
Zimbabwean footballers
Zimbabwe international footballers
People from Harare
Association football midfielders
Eagles F.C. (Zimbabwe) players
Monomotapa United F.C. players
Mushowani Stars F.C. players
ZPC Kariba F.C. players
F.C. Platinum players
Azam F.C. players
Zimbabwe Premier Soccer League players
Zimbabwean expatriate footballers
Zimbabwean expatriate sportspeople in Tanzania
Expatriate footballers in Tanzania
2021 Africa Cup of Nations players